The Tudor architectural style is the final development of Medieval architecture in England and Wales, during the Tudor period (1485–1603) and even beyond, and also the tentative introduction of Renaissance architecture to Britain. It followed the Late Gothic Perpendicular style and, gradually, it evolved into an aesthetic more consistent with trends already in motion on the continent, evidenced by other nations already having the Northern Renaissance underway Italy, and especially France already well into its revolution in art, architecture, and thought. A subtype of Tudor architecture is Elizabethan architecture, from about 1560 to 1600, which has continuity with the subsequent Jacobean architecture in the early Stuart period.

In the much more slow-moving styles of vernacular architecture, "Tudor" has become a designation for half-timbered buildings, although there are cruck and frame houses with half timbering that considerably predate 1485 and others well after 1603; an expert examination is required to determine the building's age.  In many regions stone architecture, which presents no exposed timber on the facade, was the norm for good houses, while everywhere the poorest lived in single-storey houses using wood frames and wattle and daub, too flimsy for any to have survived four centuries.  In this form the Tudor style long retained its hold on English taste. Nevertheless, "Tudor style" is an awkward style-designation, with its implied suggestions of continuity through the period of the Tudor dynasty and the misleading impression that there was a style break at the accession of James I in 1603, first of the House of Stuart. A better diagnostic is the "perpendicular" arrangement of rectangular vertically oriented leaded windows framed by structural transoms and mullions and often featuring a "hooded" surround usually in stone or timber such as oak.

The low multi-centred Tudor arch was another defining feature and the period sees the first introduction of brick architecture imported from the Low Countries. Some of the most remarkable oriel windows belong to this period. Mouldings are more spread out and the foliage becomes more naturalistic. During the reigns of Henry VIII and Edward VI, many Italian artists arrived in England; their decorative features can be seen at Hampton Court Palace, Layer Marney Tower, Sutton Place, and elsewhere. However, in the following reign of Elizabeth I, the influence of Northern Mannerism, mainly derived from books, was greater. Courtiers and other wealthy Elizabethans competed to build prodigy houses that proclaimed their status.

The Dissolution of the Monasteries redistributed large amounts of land to the wealthy, resulting in a secular building boom, as well as a source of stone. The building of churches had already slowed somewhat before the English Reformation, after a great boom in the previous century, but was brought to a nearly complete stop by the Reformation. Civic and university buildings became steadily more numerous in the period, which saw general increasing prosperity. Brick was something of an exotic and expensive rarity at the beginning of the period, but during it became very widely used in many parts of England, even for modest buildings, gradually restricting traditional methods such as wood framed, daub and wattle and half-timbering to the lower classes by the end of the period.

Scotland was a different country throughout the period, and is not covered here, but early Renaissance architecture in Scotland was influenced by close contacts between the French and Scottish courts, and there are a number of buildings from before 1560 that show a more thorough adoption of continental Renaissance styles than their English equivalents.

Development

The reign of Henry VII
Tudor style buildings have several features that separate them from Medieval and later 17th-century design. The earliest signs of the Renaissance appear under Henry VII; whereas most of his building projects are no longer standing, it is actually under him  and not his son that the Renaissance began to flower in England, evidenced by ample records of what was built and where, materials used, new features in gardening that did not at all fit the pattern of the earlier medieval walled garden, letters from the king expressing his desires and those of his wife's in the case of Greenwich Palace, as well as his own expressed interest in the New Learning. 

Prior to 1485, many wealthy and noble landowners lived in homes that were not necessarily comfortable but built to withstand sieges, though manor houses that were only lightly fortified, if at all, had been increasingly built. Castles and smaller manor houses often had moats, portcullises and crenelations designed for archers to stand guard and pick off approaching enemies.

However, with the arrival of gunpowder and cannons by the time of Henry VI, fortifications like castles became increasingly obsolete. 1485 marked the ascension of the Tudor Henry VII to the throne and the end of the Wars of the Roses that had left the royal coffers in deep trouble-Yorkists had raided the treasury just after the death of Edward IV. In 1487 Henry passed laws against livery and maintenance, which checked the nobility's ability to raise armies independent of the crown, and raised taxes on the nobility through a trusted advisor, John Morton.

Not all Tudor architecture was of a residential nature, and the dry dock in Portsmouth is very important as it laid the foundation for other civic projects done under Henry VIII and Elizabeth I. Built under Henry VII, it represented a significant advance  from what was available during the Medieval period: for most of the period ships were poorly suited to trade that reached any farther than just off the coast, and were no match for the turbulence of waters like the North Sea, let alone crossing the Atlantic. Within three years of Henry Tudor's ascension to the throne, however, Bartolomeu Dias had rounded the future tip of today's South Africa and by doing so changed the world forever: he opened up a sea passage to Asia and opened a route that completely cut out the reliance on the Silk Road and the Turks who controlled it. Ships were beginning to get faster and more capable of much longer journeys. Patronage of explorers would be a theme of the rest of Henry's adulthood, and it behooved him to take advantage of having the only place in all of Europe that could repair ships, build new ones, remove barnacles and shipworms, and break up and recycle older ships. 

Purchasing eight acres, he gave the job of constructing the dry dock to Sir Reginald Bray with the final construction, according to a 17th-century tome . It measured 330 feet on each side, the bottom of the dock 395 feet long, and the whole 22 feet deep. The wharf on the outside of the piers that marked the dock's location were 40 feet on each side at a depth of 22 feet. The dock operated by swinging some hinged gates open, allowing the ship to enter, and then water was taken out with a bucket and chain pump worked by a horse-gin.

In the early part of his reign, Henry Tudor favoured two sites, both on the River Thames though in opposite directions, with one west of Westminster and one east of it. Upon his rise to power he inherited many castles, but notably he did very little to these. Recent evidence  suggests that he made notable improvements to other properties belonging to the crown, including Greenwich Palace, also known as the Palace of Placentia. Although today the Old Royal Naval College sits on the site of the palace, evidence suggests that, shortly after ascending the throne, Henry spent a very large amount of money on enlarging it and finishing off a watchtower built prior to his reign; his Queen, Elizabeth, gave birth to Henry VIII and his brother Edmund in this palace. Henry Tudor's palace facing the Thames Estuary would have had a brick courtyard that faced the River Thames. 

As of 2018 archaeological digs continue and much has been discovered regarding the kind of palace Henry (and later his son) invested so much money and time into . An example is that Greenwich had "bee boles": these were found in the basement of the palace and were little nooks in which beehives were kept during winter when honeybees hibernate. They would be taken out to provide for the king's table in spring and they are numerous. Surprisingly, much of the remains beneath the royal college reveal an edifice built with brick, not stone: castles in England going back to the Normans had been built with stone, never brick, hence this is an early advancement in technology and style and given its load bearing position at the bottom of the building it is extremely unlikely to have been erected under the aegis of any later monarch. He also added a sizeable chapel to the grounds with black and white tiles, discovered in 2006.

Sheen, was someway down river from (and in the present day part of) London and became a primary residence as Henry's family and court grew larger. This had been one of the royal palaces since the reign of Edward II, with the most recent additions as at 1496 being by Henry V in 1414. The building was largely wooden with cloisters and several medieval features, such as a grand central banqueting hall, and the Privy Chambers facing the river very much resembling a 15th-century castle.

This burnt to the ground at Christmas 1497. However, within months Henry began a magnificent new palace in a version of Renaissance style. This, called Richmond Palace has been described as the first prodigy house, a term for the ostentatious mansions of Elizabeth's courtiers and others, and was influential on other great houses for decades to come as well as a seat of royal power and pageantry of an equivalent of modern-day Buckingham Palace or the 18th century St. James's Palace.

Henry VIII and Later 

Henry VII was succeeded by his second son, Henry VIII, a man of a very different character of his father, who spent enormous amounts of money on building many palaces, most now vanished, as well as other expensive forms of display. In a courtyard of Hampton Court Palace he installed a fountain that for celebrations flowed with wine. 
He also built military installations all along the southern coast of England and the border with Scotland, then a separate nation.

 
Henry VIII's most ambitious palace was Nonsuch Palace, south of London and now disappeared, an attempt to rival the spectacular French royal palaces of the age and, like them, using imported Italian artists, though the architecture is northern European in inspiration. Much of the Tudor palace survives at Hampton Court Palace, which Henry took over from his disgraced minister Cardinal Wolsey and expanded, and this is now the surviving Tudor royal palace that best shows the style.

As time wore on, quadrangular, 'H' or 'E' shaped floor plans became more common, with the H shape coming to fruition during the reign of Henry VII's son and successor. It was also fashionable for these larger buildings to incorporate 'devices', or riddles, designed into the building, which served to demonstrate the owner's wit and to delight visitors. Occasionally these were Catholic symbols, for example, subtle or not so subtle references to the trinity, seen in three-sided, triangular, or 'Y' shaped plans, designs or motifs. Earlier clerical buildings would have had a cross shape so as to honour Christ, such as in Old St Paul's and the surviving York Cathedral, but as with all clerical buildings, this was a time of great chaos and revolution catalyzed by Henry VIII's Reformation.

Henry began his reign as "Defender of the Faith." Such a title was given him in 1520 by Pope Leo X, however long before this he had deep roots in Catholic piety.  Both his parents were staunchly Catholic and in fact at least one aunt, Bridget of York, became a nun.  There are ample records in British royal archives of how Henry VII and his queen spent their time away from political activity. Henry VII spent a large amount of time hearing Mass every day and was noted for being quite pious, according to Polydore Vergil.  Elizabeth of York was heavily involved in charity, then as now one of the three great  virtues of the Catholic Church, evidenced by the king loaning her money when she overspent her budget on the poor and orphaned in account books that survive.  As his older brother Arthur was the one expected to rule, and not Henry, his parents selected an education for him that would have prepared him for the Church: he was tutored heavily in theology. This fateful decision later in life made him able to debate the usefulness of the clergy owning so much land and power outside the crown, and changed which version of the faith he defended.

A part of Henry VIII's policy was the suppression of the monasteries and several examples of the Middle Ages today lie in ruins because of the nobility raiding the properties for building materials, gold, and anything of monetary value: for many the only way to escape being destroyed was the monarch holding a personal interest in keeping the abbey or cathedral intact (Westminster Abbey being an excellent example.)

One of the most famous examples of this lies in East Anglia, near the village of Walsingham. Predating the Norman Conquest, this area of the present day United Kingdom was a major site of pilgrimage dedicated to the Virgin Mary, the mother of Christ. Over the centuries an Augustinian priory was erected upon the site that grew wealthy from pilgrims' donations and for its era this was one of the most popular shrines in all of England: Monarchs from nearly five centuries prior had worshipped at the place by 1510, up to and including Henry VII and Elizabeth.  Men as famous as Erasmus also visited and the natural spring per Catholic tradition had healing powers. During Henry VIII's Reformation, however, the records show that the monks at Walsingham were turned out into the streets, the priory chapel was desecrated, and the gold and silver ornamentations of the architecture were looted. The statue of Our Lady of Walsingham at the centre of the shrine was brought back to London as a trophy to be destroyed, and the property itself was turned over to a man in the king's favour whereafter it was mined for its stone.

The great majority of images, and elements of church furniture disapproved of by the Protestants, were destroyed in waves under Henry VIII, Edward VI, and later during the English Commonwealth. For example, during the reign of Edward VI parishioners witnessed a royal decree ripping out the rood screen in every single church: none of these now survive and in addition many altarpieces were burned. While Henry VIII was still alive, many statues and shrine objects were smashed or burnt: they were considered "abused images" and a form of idolatry by many aligning with the king. Building of new churches became much less frequent, and as a result England actually has larger numbers of medieval churches whose main fabric has survived than most parts of Europe. Tragically, however, larger buildings like Jervaulx or Fountains, buildings whose wealth and grandeur were meant to rival Notre-Dame de Paris often do not even have their stained glass windows and are a shadow of their former selves. Other places were outright moved into and at best have tiny fragments of the original medieval priories, abbeys, and monasteries.

Henry and Edward are responsible for enormous losses and gaps in the cultural record; the damage was massive. Manuscripts, many of them illuminated, were lost, with many being burned. Some of these went back to the time of the Anglo-Saxons, but as few could read the runic alphabet (including the king himself) they were destroyed and their intricate covers, sometimes bejeweled, were looted. Distinctly English styles of craftsmanship in religious metalwork for chalices, bishops' croziers, patens, and cruets were melted down for the crown.

During this period, the arrival of the chimney stack and enclosed hearths resulted in the decline of the great hall based around an open hearth that was typical of earlier Medieval architecture. Instead, fireplaces could now be placed upstairs and it became possible to have a second story that ran the whole length of the house. Tudor chimney-pieces were made large and elaborate to draw attention to the owner's adoption of this new technology. The jetty appeared, as a way to show off the modernity of having a complete, full-length upper floor.

Hallmarks of Tudor architecture

Upper classes
Buildings constructed by the wealthy or royal had these common characteristics:

An 'E' or 'H' shaped floor plan
 Brick and stone masonry, sometimes with half timbers on upper floors in grand houses earlier in the period
Recycling of older medieval stone, especially after Henry VIII's Dissolution of the Monasteries. Some reuse of monastery buildings as houses.
Curvilinear gables, an influence taken from Dutch designs, from the mid-century
Displays of glass in large windows several feet long; only the rich could afford numerous expensive large windows. Heraldic stained glass was provided by Galyon Hone and others
Depressed arches in clerical and aristocratic design, especially in the early-middle portion of the period
Hammerbeam roofs still in use for great halls from Medieval period under Henry VII until 1603; were built more decoratively, often with geometric-patterned beams and corbels carved into beasts
Most windows, except large ones, are rectangular, and drip moulds common above them. 
Classical accents such as round-headed arches over doors and alcoves, plus prominent balustrades from time of Henry VIII to Elizabeth I
 Large brick chimneys, often topped with narrow decorative chimney pots in the homes of the upper middle class and higher. Ordinary medieval village houses were often made much pleasanter to live in by the addition of brick fireplaces and chimneys, replacing an open hearth.
 Wide, enormous stone fireplaces with very large hearths meant to accommodate larger scale entertaining; in aristocratic homes the formal rooms may have large chimneypieces in stone, sometimes with the family's heraldry.
Enormous ironwork for spit roasting located inside cooking fireplaces. In the homes of the upper class and nobility it was fashionable to show off wealth by being able to roast all manner of beasts weighing less than 500 grams on up to a full grown bull; in the case of royalty it would be seen as dishonor if the monarch's table could not provide equal to that of the Continental powers of France and Spain. Managing the flames would be the job of either a spit boy (Henry VII's reign) or later on a new invention where a turnspit dog ran on a treadmill (Elizabeth I's reign.)
Long galleries 
Tapestries serving a triple purpose of keeping out chill, decorating the interior, and displaying wealth. In the wealthiest homes these may contain gold or silver thread. Cornelius van der Strete added arms and ciphers to royal tapestries.
Gilt detailing inside and outside the home
Geometric landscaping in the back of the home: large gardens and enclosed courtyards were a feature of the very wealthy. Fountains begin to appear in the reign of Henry VIII.
Arms- The Tudor dynasty is famous for using its Tudor rose as a decorative device, but also the royal coat of arms was in use throughout the period as a p.r. and marketing tool and today is an important marker that dates a structure, singles it out from any other coat of arms, and if authentic can prove its provenance: it would have been a feature of the furniture as well as ironwork. Very specific to royalty, the royal coat of arms of the House of Tudor would have been distinct from all others that have sat the throne: in common with most royal houses, the three lions passant and the fleur de lys pattern did impale the shield, with the motto of "God and my right." In common with all arms since Edward III, they all have the gold lion passant guardant standing upon a chapeau, bearing a royal crown on its head. However, this period specifically hd the Greyhound Argent collared Gules plus a matching red dragon gules sinister garnished and armed Or, a nod to the Welsh origins of the House of Tudor and Henry VII's claim to be the heir of Cadwaldr. For Henry VII, the dragon occasionally would have been replaced with a lion rampant and had red mantling lined with ermine; this distinguishes it from his son, Henry VIII, who lined his with gold. Mary I had the black eagle rampant sinister as a supporter, a nod to her marriage to Philip II of Spain.

Lower classes
The houses and buildings of ordinary people were typically timber framed. Timber framing on the upper floors of a house started appearing after 1400 CE in Europe and originally it was a method used to keep water from going back into the walls, instead being redirected back to the soil. The frame was usually filled with wattle and daub but occasionally with brick. These houses were also slower to adopt the latest trends, and the great hall continued to prevail. Fireplaces were quite large by modern standards, and intended to heat as much of the home as possible as well as cook upon them because in this period England was much more prone to snow.

Smaller Tudor-style houses display the following characteristics:

Simpler square or rectangular floor plans in market towns or cities
Farmhouses retain a small fat 'H' shape and traces of late Medieval architecture; modification was less expensive than entirely rebuilding.
Steeply pitched roof, with thatching or tiles of slate or more rarely clay (London did not ban thatched roofs within the city until the 1660s)
Cruck framing in use throughout the period
Hammerbeam roofs retained for sake of utility (remained common in barns)
Prominent cross gables
Tall, narrow doors and windows
Small diamond-shaped window panes, typically with lead casings to hold them together
Dormer windows, late in the period
Flagstone or dirt floors rather than all stone and wood
Half-timbers made of oak, with wattle and daub walls painted white
Brickwork in homes of gentry, especially Elizabethan. As with upper classes, conformed to a set size of  ×  × , bonded by mortar with a high lime content
Jettied top floor to increase interior space; This was very common in market town high streets and larger cities like London.
Extremely narrow to nonexistent space between buildings in towns 
Inglenook fireplaces. Open floor fireplaces were a feature during the time of Henry VII but had declined in use by the 1560s for all but the poor as the growing middle classes were becoming more able to build them into their homes. The largest fireplace—in the kitchen—had a hook nailed into the wall for hanging a cooking cauldron rather than the tripod of an open plan. Many chimneys were coated with lime or plaster inside to the misfortune of the owner: when heated these would decompose and thus the very first fire codes were implemented during the reign of Elizabeth I, as many lost their homes because of faulty installation.
Oven not separated from apparatus used in fireplace, especially after the reign of Edward VI; middle-class homes had no use for such enormous ovens nor money to build them.
More emphasis on wooden staircases in homes of the middle class and gentry
Outhouses in the back of the home, especially beyond cities in market towns, often referred to as "the jakes" in documents that survive. Flushable toilets were centuries away for the middle classes and in some less common cases they would not move indoors completely until the second half of the 20th century.
Little landscaping behind the home, but rather small herb gardens. Occasionally bee skeps would be kept in this area as a means of getting wax for candles and also, when in season, honey.
The poorest classes lived in hovels, a building with a slightly different definition than today: it was a one-room wattle-and-daub hut. Most did not have the copyhold on the land they occupied and were tenants on another man's land; amenities were very basic in that there was a place to sleep, a place to eat, and a place to cook.

Examples

Institutional

Ecclesiastical

The final stages of King's College Chapel, Cambridge (1446–1515)
St Peter and St Paul's Church, Lavenham, Suffolk (1485–1525)
Red Mount Chapel, King's Lynn, Norfolk (ca. 1485–1533)
St. George's Chapel, Windsor Castle (1475–1528)
St Winefride's Well Holywell, Flintshire, Wales (1490)
The central tower and strainer arches of Canterbury Cathedral, Kent (1493–97)
The retrochoir at Peterborough Cathedral, Cambs. (1496-1508)
The Lady Chapel at Rochester Cathedral, Kent (1500–12)
Bath Abbey, Somerset (1501–39)
St Edmundsbury Cathedral, Suffolk (1503)
The nave of Ripon Cathedral, N. Yorks. (1502–22)
Henry VII Lady Chapel at Westminster Abbey, London (1503–1509)
Church of St. John the Baptist, Cirencester, Glos. (1508–30)
The cloister at Bristol Cathedral (ca. 1515–26)
Chapel of St. Mary at Smith Gate, Oxford (1520–21; "The Octagon", Hertford College)
Chantry chapels at Ely Cathedral, Exeter Cathedral, Worcester Cathedral, Salisbury Cathedral, Winchester Cathedral and others
London churches of St. Peter ad Vincula, St. Andrew Undershaft, Savoy Chapel, and St. Augustine's, Hackney

Academic
Magdalen Tower, Oxford (1492–1509)
First Court, Christ's College, Cambridge (1505–11)
Old Quad, Brasenose College, Oxford (1509–22)
First Quad (1511–20) & Second Quad (1598-1602), St. John's College, Cambridge
Front Quad, Corpus Christi College, Oxford (1517)
Tom Quad, Christ Church, Oxford (1525–29)
Caius Court, Gonville & Caius College, Cambridge (1565)
Great Court, Trinity College, Cambridge (1599-1608)

Commercial
Thaxted Guildhall, Essex (late 15th century)
Malmesbury Market Cross, Wiltshire (ca. 1490)
Market Cross, Shepton Mallet, Somerset (ca. 1500)
Lavenham Guildhall, Suffolk (1529)
Much Wenlock Guildhall, Shropshire (1587)
Shrewsbury Old Market Hall, Shropshire (1597)
Old Royal Exchange, London (1565–71 by Thomas Gresham; burned 1666)

Inns of Court

Lincoln's Inn Old Hall (ca. 1490)
Gray's Inn Hall (1559; damaged in the Blitz and restored)
Middle Temple Hall (1562–72; damaged in the Blitz and restored)
Staple Inn (1580–86)

Other
The Tribunal, Glastonbury (ca. 1500)
Globe Theater, London (1599; d. & rebuilt, 1613–14; b. 1644) Replica built approximately 1 city block away from original site on South Bank of the Thames.  
St. John's Gate, Clerkenwell Priory, London (1504)
Ford's Hospital, Coventry

Domestic

Royal Residences
Henry VII, Greenwich Palace, Greenwich, London (1498-1504; d. 1660) Archaeological work done on palace within last 30 years.  Current ruins directly underneath modern Naval College.
Henry VII, Richmond Palace, Richmond-upon-Thames, London (1498-1502, d. 1649) Fragments of original palace still extant. Fell out of favour after the Stuart Dynasty.  
Henry VIII, Bridewell Palace, London (1515–23, b. 1666)
Henry VIII, Palace of Beaulieu, Essex (1516–27, partially d.)
Henry VIII, Leeds Castle, Kent (1519)
Henry VIII, Hunsdon House, Herts. (1525, partially d.)
Henry VIII, St. James's Palace, Westminster, London (1531–44)
Henry VIII, Oatlands Palace, Surrey (1538, d.)
Henry VIII, Queen Elizabeth's Hunting Lodge at Great Standing, Chingford, London (1542–43)
Henry VIII, Nonsuch Palace, Epsom, Surrey (1538; d. 1682)

Other Palaces

Bishop Richard FitzJames, Fulham Palace, Fulham, London (1480–1522)
Cardinal Morton, portions of Lambeth Palace, Lambeth, London (1495)
Cardinal Morton, Hatfield Old Palace, Herts. (1497, partly d.)
Cardinal Wolsey, Hampton Court Palace, Richmond-upon-Thames, London (1498–1502)
Cardinal Wolsey, Palace of Whitehall, Westminster, London (1514–30; burned 1691; see Holbein Gate)
Sir Christopher Hatton, Holdenby Palace, Northants. (1583, d.)
Lord Burghley, Theobalds Palace, Herts. (1564–85, d.)

Metropolitan London
London Charterhouse Great Hall (1545)
Great Hall, Carew Manor, Beddington (ca. 1510)
Sutton House, Hackney (1535)
Suffolk Place, Southwark (1522; d. 1557)
Hall Place, Bexley (1537–1649)
Syon House, Isleworth (1552)
Broomfield House, Enfield (ca. 1560)
Eastbury Manor House, Dagenham (1566–73)

Outside of London

(see Prodigy house)
Compton Wynyates, Warks. (1481–1515)
Oxburgh Hall, Norfolk (1482-& seq.)
Prysten House, Plymouth, Devon (ca. 1490)
Athelhampton House, Dorset (1493-1550)
Paycocke's House and Garden, Coggeshall, Essex (ca. 1500)
Dorney Court, Bucks. (ca. 1500)
Little Moreton Hall, Ches. (1504–62)
Thornbury Castle, Glos. (1508–21)
Coughton Court, Warks. (1509–22)
Helmingham Hall, Suffolk (1510; remodeled)
Layer Marney Tower, Essex (1520)
East Barsham Manor, Norfolk (ca. 1520)
Sutton Place, Surrey (ca. 1525)
Hengrave Hall, Suffolk (1525–1538)
Chenies Manor House, Bucks. (ca. 1530-1550)
Speke Hall, Liverpool (1530–98)
Rufford Old Hall, Lancs. (1530)
Cowdray Castle, Sussex (1533–38)
Barrington Court, Somerset (1538–50)
Kentwell Hall, Suffolk (1540–63)
Haslington Hall, Ches. (1545)
Broughton Castle, Oxon. (ca. 1550)
Cothelstone Manor, Somerset (ca. 1550)
Great Fosters, Surrey (ca. 1550)
The east tower, Wilton House, Wilts. (ca. 1551)
Melford Hall, Suffolk (1554–59)
Burghley House, Peterborough, Cambs. (1555–87)
Sawston Hall, Cambs. (1557–84)
Englefield House, Berks. (1557)
Charlecote Park, Warks. (1558)
Burton Constable Hall, E. Yorks. (ca. 1560)
Pitchford Hall, Salop. (ca. 1560)
Loseley Park, Surrey (1562–68)
Handforth Hall, Ches. (1562)
Old Gorhambury House, Herts. (1563–68; ruins)
Additions by Lord Leicester to Kenilworth Castle, (1563–75; ruined 1649)
Chequers Court, Bucks. (1565)
Longleat, Somerset (1567 by Robert Smythson & al.)
Kirby Hall, Northants. (1570–75; ruins)
Great Chamber at Gilling Castle, N. Yorks. (1571–75)
Castle Ashby, Northants. (1574-1635)
Longford Castle, Wilts. (1576–91)
Churche's Mansion, Nantwich, Ches. (1577)
Parham Park, W. Sussex (1577)
Rainthorpe Hall, Norfolk (1579-& seq.)
Wollaton Hall, Nottingham (1580-88 by Robert Smythson)
Benthall Hall, Salop. (1580)
Castle Lodge, Ludlow, Salop. (1580)
Shaw House, Newbury, Berks. (1581)
Corsham Court, Wilts. (1582)
Barlborough Hall, Derbys. (1583)
Mapledurham House, Mapledurham, Oxon. (ca. 1585)
Wilderhope Manor, Shropshire. (ca.1585) 
Brereton Hall, Ches. (1586)
Wakehurst Place, W Sussex (ca. 1590)
Hardwick Hall, Derbys. (1590-97 by Robert Smythson)
Hall-i’-th’-Wood, Bolton, Manchester (1591-1648)
Condover Hall, Salop. (1591–98, attr. to John Thorpe)
Anglesey Abbey, Cambs. (ca. 1591)
Stanley Palace, Chester (ca. 1591)
Longford Castle, Salisbury, Wilts. (1591 by John Thorpe & al.)
Danny House, W Sussex (1593–95)
Doddington Hall, Lincs. (1593-1600 by Robert Smythson)
Milton Hall, Cambs. (1593–94)
Gayhurst House, Bucks. (1597-1603)
Cold Ashton Manor, Glos.(1597-1601)
Fountains Hall, N. Yorks. (1598-1604)
Montacute House, Somerset (1598 by William Arnold)
Bramall Hall, Manchester (ca. 1599)
Rotherwas House, Herefords. (1600–11; d., interior now at Amherst College, see Rotherwas Room)
Gawthorpe Hall, Lancs. (1600–04, attr. to Robert Smythson)
Westwood House, Worcs. (1600)
Hartwell House, Bucks. (ea. 17th C.)
Burton Agnes Hall, E. Yorks. (1601–10, attr. to Robert Smythson)

Tudor Revival

In the 19th century a free mix of late Gothic elements, Tudor, and Elizabethan were combined for public buildings, such as hotels and railway stations, as well as for residences. The popularity continued into the 20th century for residential building. This type of Renaissance Revival architecture is called 'Tudor,' 'Mock Tudor,' 'Tudor Revival,' 'Elizabethan,' 'Tudorbethan,' and 'Jacobethan.' 

Tudor and Elizabethan precedents were the clear inspiration for many 19th and 20th century grand country houses in the United States and the British Commonwealth countries. A 19th and 20th century movement to build revivalist institutional buildings at schools and hospitals often drew from famous Tudor examples such as the Collegiate Gothic architectural style.

References

Further reading
Airs, Malcolm, The Buildings of Britain, A Guide and Gazetteer, Tudor and Jacobean, 1982, Barrie & Jenkins (London),  
Airs, Malcolm, The Tudor and Jacobean Country House: A Building History, 1998, Bramley, 978-1858338330
Garner, Thomas and Arthur James Stratton, Domestic Architecture of England during the Tudor Period. London: B.T. Batsford, 1908–1911.
Henderson, Paula, The Tudor House and Garden: Architecture and Landscape in the Sixteenth and Early Seventeenth Centuries, 2005, Paul Mellon Centre for Studies in British Art/ Yale University Press, 978-0300106879 
Howard, Maurice, The Early Tudor Country House: Architecture and Politics 1490–1550, 1987, Hamlyn, 978-0540011193

Building by building
Jenkins, Simon, England's Thousand Best Churches, 1999, Allen Lane, 
Jenkins, Simon, England's Thousand Best Houses, 2003, Allen Lane, 
John Julius Norwich, The Architecture of Southern England, Macmillan, London, 1985,

External links

 www.tudor-buildings.co.uk

 
Architectural styles
British architectural styles
House styles
Architecture
 
Architecture in England by period or style
15th-century architecture
16th-century architecture
17th-century architecture